Morton Township, Nebraska may refer to the following places:

Morton Township, Boyd County, Nebraska
Morton Township, Knox County, Nebraska

See also

Morton Township (disambiguation)

Nebraska township disambiguation pages